Slovak Women's Basketball Extraliga (currently through sponsorship also Niké Women's Extraliga) is a tournament composed of Slovak women's basketball teams. The first draw took place in 1993. Young Angels Košice is the most successful team with 15 title wins, MBK Ružomberok has won 14 titles.

Teams 
In the season 2022/23, these following teams were playing in the Extraliga.

Champions

Notes

External links
Slovak Women's Basketball Extraliga

Slovakia
Women
Sports leagues established in 1993
Women's basketball in Slovakia
Professional sports leagues in Slovakia